Danny John McNamara (born 27 December 1998) is an Irish professional footballer who plays as a full back for Championship club Millwall.

Playing career

Millwall
McNamara began his career as a youth player at Millwall, signing his first professional contract with the club in July 2017.

Loan spells
McNamara spent time on loan during the 2018–19 season at Welling United, Dover Athletic and Havant & Waterlooville. Upon his return in May 2019, McNamara signed a new one-year contract with Millwall with an option for a further year.

On 31 July 2019, McNamara joined League Two side Newport County on a season long loan. On 3 August 2019, he made his Football League debut for Newport, being named in the starting line-up for a 2–2 draw against Mansfield Town on the opening day of the 2019–20 season. On 6 January 2020, Millwall recalled McNamara from his loan spell at Newport.

On 14 July 2020, McNamara and fellow Lion Isaac Olaofe joined Scottish Premiership side St Johnstone on season-long loans. On 4 January 2021, McNamara was recalled by Millwall, with teammate James Brown being sent on loan to St Johnstone.

Return to Millwall and breakthrough
Following his return to Millwall in early January 2021, McNamara made his debut for the club on 9 January 2021 in an FA Cup victory over Boreham Wood and made his league debut three days later in a 1–1 away draw with AFC Bournemouth.

On 9 April 2022, McNamara opened his account for the club with the first two goals in a 4–1 thrashing of Barnsley.

International
On 28 August 2019, McNamara was named in the Republic of Ireland Under-21 squad. He qualifies through his grandparents from Leitrim.

Career statistics

References

External links

Living people
Footballers from Sidcup
Republic of Ireland association footballers
Republic of Ireland youth international footballers
English footballers
English people of Irish descent
Association football midfielders
Millwall F.C. players
Welling United F.C. players
Dover Athletic F.C. players
Havant & Waterlooville F.C. players
Newport County A.F.C. players
St Johnstone F.C. players
1998 births
National League (English football) players
English Football League players
Scottish Professional Football League players